FK Jaunība is Latvian football club located in Riga. The club currently plays in Virsliga – the top tier of Latvian football. Previously they played in Latvian First League (the second tier of Latvian football), but after finishing the 2009/2010 season in the 2nd place and winning the relegation/promotion play-off matches against FK Daugava Riga, they qualified for the highest league.

League and Cup history

Current squad 
As of July 25, 2010

 (captain)

For recent squad changes see: List of Latvian football transfers summer 2010.

External links 
 FK Jaunība Rīga (Official Site)

Jauniba
2006 establishments in Latvia
Association football clubs established in 2006